Coleophora anitella is a moth of the family Coleophoridae. It is found in France and Spain.

The larvae feed on Juncus acutus. They feed on the generative organs of their host plant.

References

anitella
Moths described in 1985
Moths of Europe